The 1997 IIHF Asian Oceanic Junior U18 Championship was the 14th edition of the IIHF Asian Oceanic Junior U18 Championship. It took place between 14 and 17 March 1997 in Seoul, South Korea. The tournament was won by Japan, who claimed their ninth title by finishing first in the standings. Kazakhstan and South Korea finished second and third respectively.

Standings

Fixtures
Reference

References

External links
International Ice Hockey Federation

IIHF Asian Oceanic U18 Championships
Asian
International ice hockey competitions hosted by South Korea
1997 in South Korean sport